is a railway station on the Okinawa Urban Monorail (Yui Rail) in Urasoe, Okinawa Prefecture, Japan. It is the eastern terminus of the line.

Lines 
Okinawa Urban Monorail

Adjacent stations

History

References

External links
  

Railway stations in Japan opened in 2019
Railway stations in Okinawa Prefecture